Kelli McGonagill Finglass (born December 30, 1964) is the current director of the Dallas Cowboys Cheerleaders. She is also a former member of the squad.  She appears in and is an executive producer of the CMT reality series Dallas Cowboys Cheerleaders: Making the Team.

Early life and education
Born Kelli McGonagill, Finglass is from Lindale, Texas, and graduated from Lindale High School She danced and twirled from an early age. She continued her studies in Modern Dance at Texas Christian University, where she joined Alpha Delta Pi, and received a Bachelor of Arts in International Marketing from the University of North Texas.

Career
Finglass was a member of the Dallas Cowboys Cheerleaders from 1984 to 1989, where she was the first cheerleader to be invited back without having to go through the customary audition process.

After leaving the squad in 1989, Finglass was hired by Jerry Jones as an assistant director to the DCC from 1989 to 1990. She then took a position in the sales and promotions department for the Dallas Cowboys and in 1991 was promoted to director of the Cheerleaders. As well as director, she also acts as business manager. She has expanded the organization, receiving many corporate sponsors and creating a business out of the DCC brand. She also has created and refined different competitions hosted by the Dallas Cowboys Cheerleaders, including the DCC Dance & Drill Team Competitions, Camp DCC, Cheers for Years, and Cheers for Fitness. She currently serves as an executive producer for CMT's hit series Dallas Cowboys Cheerleaders: Making the Team.

Finglass also played herself in the film Dr. T & the Women.

Personal life
Finglass has been married to Joel Finglass since 1996. The couple have a son, Ryan and a daughter named Samantha. They reside in Coppell, Texas. They attend Tambourine Church.

References

External links
 

American cheerleaders
American choreographers
American female dancers
Dancers from Texas
Television producers from Texas
American women television producers
Dallas Cowboys personnel
National Football League cheerleaders
People from Lindale, Texas
Living people
Texas Christian University alumni
University of North Texas alumni
Participants in American reality television series
1964 births
People from Coppell, Texas
21st-century American women